Viscount Sydney (an alternative spelling of the surname Sidney) is a title that has been created twice. The title was elevated twice from a barony, and once into an earldom.

First creation (1689)

The first creation came on 9 April 1689 when Henry Sydney was elevated from Baron Sydney to Viscount Sydney, of Sheppey, in the Peerage of England. On 14 May 1694, he was also created Earl of Romney but his titles became extinct when he died unmarried in 1704.

Second creation (1789)

The second creation came in 1789 when Thomas Townshend (the then Baron Sydney) was made Viscount Sydney, of St Leonards, in the Peerage of Great Britain. He served as Home Secretary and Leader of the House of Lords. Townshend was the son of the Hon. Thomas Townshend, second son of Charles Townshend, 2nd Viscount Townshend, whose eldest son Charles Townshend, 3rd Viscount Townshend is the ancestor of the Marquesses of Townshend. Townshend was also a female-line great-great-grandson of Lady Lucy Sydney, daughter of Robert Sydney, 2nd Earl of Leicester, hence his choice of title. The family seat of this branch of the Townshend family was Frognal House, near Sidcup in the London Borough of Bexley.

List of Viscounts Sydney (1789) 
 Thomas Townshend, 1st Viscount Sydney (1733–1800) - the cities of Sydney (1785) in Nova Scotia, Canada, and Sydney (1788) in New South Wales, Australia, were named in his honour
 John Thomas Townshend, 2nd Viscount Sydney (1764–1831) - represented Newport and Whitchurch in the House of Commons. 
John Robert Townshend, 3rd Viscount Sydney (1805–1890) - served as Lord Chamberlain of the Household and as Lord Steward of the Household, and was elevated to Earl Sydney in 1874. He died childless in February 1890, aged 84, when all his titles became extinct.

See also 
Sidney (surname)

References

External links 
 Thomas Townshend, 1st Viscount Sydney at the National Gallery
 John Thomas Townshend, 2nd Viscount Sydney at the National Gallery
 Caroline Elizabeth Letitia Townshend (née Clements), Viscountess Sydney at the National Gallery

1689 establishments in England
1704 disestablishments in England
1789 establishments in Great Britain
1890 disestablishments in the United Kingdom
 
Extinct viscountcies in the Peerage of England
Extinct viscountcies in the Peerage of Great Britain
Noble titles created in 1689
Noble titles created in 1789